The NWE No. 21II, later DR 99 6001 is a narrow gauge steam locomotive that was built in 1939 for a track gauge of one metre and is still on duty with the Harz Narrow Gauge Railways (HSB) today.

History 
The locomotive was the only unit to be built of a planned series of standard superheated steam locomotives with the axle arrangements 1'C1', 1'D1' and 1'E1', that the Nordhausen-Wernigerode Railway Company (NWE), the Gernrode-Harzgerode Railway Company and the South Harz Railway Company had ordered from Friedrich Krupp AG for replacing their older, less economic saturated steam engines. In standardising their designs, it was envisaged that as many parts of the locomotives as possible would be used across the whole range in the interests of economic production, simplified spare part stock holdings and easier maintenance and servicing. But because the development order was not given by the Deutsche Reichsbahn and because different construction conventions were followed in some cases, these were not seen as Einheitsloks, the standard locomotives produced by the DR between the wars. As a result of the outbreak of World War II, however, ony the prototyped of the 1'C1' version was built in 1939 by Krupp; orders for the other engines were cancelled.

The prototype locomotive was accepted into service by the NWE as No. 21 (the second to carry that number) and, following the takeover of the NWE by the East German Deutsche Reichsbahn in 1949, was renumbered to 99 6001. In 1970 the loco was given the computer number 99 6001-4.

In 1956 the engine was transferred, initially temporarily, from the Harz Railway to the Selke Valley Railway. In 1961 this became permanent. After the re-joining of the two lines in 1983/1984 it was once again used for duties on the Harz Railway, for example to head the first scheduled passenger train between Gernrode and Hasselfelde via Stiege on 3 June 1984.

Between 1991 and 1994 it did brief service in green livery as no. 21 in charge of the heritage train (Traditionszug), a special made up of historic coaches, which the Mallet locomotives to that point could not haul as their brakes were not compatible with the new compressed-air brakes of the train. In addition it carried out duties from its home station of Gernrode.

Technical features 
In designing and building the NWE 21II the firm of Krupp made extensive use of welding, even for the boiler, in contrast with the contemporary design approach of the Reichsbahn Einheitslokomotiven.

The three driven wheelsets are fixed firmly in a bar frame with a 70 mm side thickness (Wangenstärke). The two front and rear carrying axles are able to swing out radially and are housed in a Bissell truck.

The boiler is fed by two feedwater pumps.

The two outside cylinders, which are slightly tilted to cope with the constraints of the rail gauge, are driven by Heusinger valve gear with Kuhn slides.
The factory-fitted Schulz piston valves were late replaced by Trofimoff piston valves. These gave better running performance when the locomotive was free-running (Leerlauf) and the regulator was closed, because they practically relieve the cylinder of its job as an air pump when the steam pressure is released.

References

External links 

 Data sheet at Freundeskreis Selketalbahn

2-6-2T locomotives
1′C1′ h2t locomotives
Krupp locomotives
Preserved steam locomotives of Germany
Metre gauge steam locomotives
Narrow gauge steam locomotives of Germany
Private locomotives of Germany